Taukelina Finikaso (born 10 January 1959) is a political figure from the Pacific nation of Tuvalu. At the 2006 general election, he was elected MP for his home constituency of Vaitupu. He was educated in Kiribati and Fiji before acquiring a Law Degree at the University of Tasmania and a master's degree in International Law from Sydney University. Finikaso was admitted on 16 October 1987 to the Supreme Court of the Australian Capital Territory. Prior to entering into politics, Finikaso worked as a lawyer and then as a Permanent Secretary under the different ministries of the Government. Finikaso has been a Member of Parliament for the Constituency of Vaitupu from 2006 to 2019.  He was not re-elected in the 2019 general election.

Career

1987–1992: Crown-Counsel in the Attorney General's Office 
1992–1994: Permanent Secretary for the Ministry of Natural Resources 
1994–1996: Permanent Secretary for the Ministry of Home Affairs & Labour 
1996–1997: Permanent Secretary for the Ministry of Health and Human Resources Development 
1997 – Established the office for the Trade Commissioner in Asia, based in Hong-Kong 
1997–1998: Permanent Secretary for the Ministry of Health, Women and Community Affairs 
1998–1999: Permanent Secretary for the Ministry of Works, Energy and Communications 
2000–2005: Tuvalu's High Commissioner to Fiji

Ministerial offices

Newly elected Prime Minister Apisai Ielemia initially appointed him Minister of Communications and Works, then as Minister for Communications, Transport and Tourism.

At the September 2010 general election, Finikaso was re-elected as MP for Vaitupu. Maatia Toafa was elected to the premiership, and appointed Finikaso as part of his Cabinet, with the portfolio of Minister for Communications, Transport and Fisheries. He lost office just three months later, when Toafa's government was brought down by a motion of no confidence.

Taukelina Finikaso was appointed the Foreign Minister on 5 August 2013; and served as the minister during the Sopoaga Ministry.

See also

List of foreign ministers in 2017
Foreign relations of Tuvalu
Politics of Tuvalu

References

External links

 

People from Vaitupu
Members of the Parliament of Tuvalu
Communication ministers of Tuvalu
Environment ministers of Tuvalu
Fisheries ministers of Tuvalu
Foreign Ministers of Tuvalu
Labour ministers of Tuvalu
Public works ministers of Tuvalu
Transport ministers of Tuvalu
Tourism ministers of Tuvalu
Living people
1959 births